Raksha Rekha is a 1949 Telugu-language swashbuckler film, produced and directed by R. Padmanabhan. It stars Akkineni Nageswara Rao, Bhanumathi Ramakrishna and Anjali Devi, with music composed by Ogirala Ramachandra Rao and H. R. Padmanabha Sastry.

Plot
The film begins on Kalavathi, the only daughter of Simhala King Rajasimha, who is averse to marriage. So was Sudhakara, son of King Parthapa of Avanthi. Unable to convince him to get married, King Parthapa keeps him, along with a servant Dooradarsi, in a dilapidated house in the forest. Angels, led by Chitra, make a visit to the nearby Vishnu temple. Surprised at the glowing light from the otherwise haunted house, they enter it and find a handsome prince sleeping there. They lift him along with the cot and place him in Kalavathi's palace. In a trance, Kalavathi and Sudhakara exchange rings. The next day their marriage is performed. The same day Chitra turns the prince into a garland and takes him with her. Kalavathi, in the guise of a man, goes in search of him. On the way she meets princess Chandrika, who takes her to be a man, falls in love and marries her. Later, she learns of Kalavathi's story and vows to help her. Meanwhile, Chitra, frustrated with the adamant Sudhakara, who detests her, turns him into a statue and throws him before Kalavathi in Chandrika's place. A crestfallen Kalavathi throws away the Raksha Rekha that Markandeya Maharshi had given her for her protection. The Maharshi appears and converts Sudhakara back into human form. The couple live happily ever after.

Cast
Akkineni Nageswara Rao as Sudhakar 
Bhanumathi Ramakrishna as Kalavathi 
Anjali Devi as Chitra
Kasturi Siva Rao as Dooradarsi
Vangara as Mantravaadi
Balijepalli Lakshmikantham as Maharju Parthapa
Ramanatha Sastry as Maharaju Rajasimha
Damerla Satyanarayana as Markandeya
Kanakam as Yashini
Jr. Lakshmirajyam as Chandrika 
Vijaya Lakshmi as Vasumathi

Crew
Art: 
Choreography: Vedantam Raghavayya
Story - Dialogues - Lyrics: Balijepalli Lakshmikantham
Playback: Ghantasala, Bhanumathi Ramakrishna, A. P. Komala, Kasturi Siva Rao
Music: Ogirala Ramachandra Rao, HR Padmanabha Sastry
Editing: 
Cinematography: T. Marconi
Screenplay - Producer - Director: R. Padmanabhan 
Banner: R. Padmanabhan Productions
Release Date: 30 April 1949

Soundtrack

Music composed by Ogirala Ramachandra Rao, H. R. Padmanabha Sastry. Lyrics were written by Balijepalli Lakshmikantham. Music released on Audio Company.

References

Indian epic films
Films based on Indian folklore
Indian black-and-white films
Indian romantic drama films
1949 romantic drama films
1949 films
Films scored by Ogirala Ramachandra Rao
Films scored by H. R. Padmanabha Sastry